Fedir Andriyovych Lyzohub (Fyodor Andreevich Lizogub; 1851 — 1928) was a Ukrainian public and state figure, politician and the Otaman of Council of Ministers (Ukrainian State) in 1918. In 1917 he headed department of Foreign Subjects at the Ministry of Foreign Affairs of the Russian Republic.

Biography
He was the son of Nadezhda Dmitrievna Dunin-Borkowska and Andriy Ivanovych Lyzohub, a poet and a friend of Taras Shevchenko.

Fedir Lyzohub founded the Poltava Museum of Regional Studies, ensured that the Poltava administration building was built in the Ukrainian style, and installed a monument to Ivan Kotlyarevsky in Poltava. He also financially supported the Mykola Hohol School of Visual Arts in Myrhorod.

On 19 August 1918 Lyzohub gave interview to German newspaper Berliner Tageblatt und Handels-Zeitung as Minister-President Lyzogub.

In 8-14 November 1918 along with Skoropadsky, Lyzohub participated in secret negotiations with the Russian Grand Duke Nicholas Nikolaevich of Russia in Crimea. Negotiations were taking place at the Dulber Palace in Koreiz (Crimean Southern Coast). In his absence, plenary sessions of government were chaired by Minister of Finance Anton Rzhepetsky. Talks about the Lyzohub's resignation appeared already on 11 November 1918 that were originated by Ukrainian activist Yevhen Chykalenko, according to whom three ministers Lyzohub, Rzhepetsky and Rohoza have resigned.

The Minister of Internal Affairs in the Lyzohub government Viktor Reinbot in his memoirs has explained the situation as following: "Soon Premier Lyzohub departed for Odessa to adjust relations with the High Command of the Austria-Hungary and for negotiations with the Crimea, with which obviously groundlessly was instigated unnecessary customs war. In Odessa it was expected to arrange a conference about the "Southern Alliance" of Ukraine, Don, Kuban, and Terek".

That trip was crucially needed due to change of political situation in Europe with the end of the World War I. The military occupation of Ukraine by armed forces of the Central Powers was nearing the end. The military commandant of Austria-Hungary in Odessa field marshal Eduard Edler von Böltz committed suicide when he found out that Austria-Hungary lost the war. At the same time field marshal Alfred Krauß who led the Austrian Ost-Armee (East Army) left earlier for homeland.

Family

Fedir Lyzohub was a distant descendant of Yakiv Lyzohub who was the acting Hetman of the Zaporizhian Host after the death of Danylo Apostol.

He had two brothers, Dmytro and Illya (who was married to Sofia Barshevska).

Fedir Lyzohub had four daughters (Olena, 1890; Lysaveta, 1892; Vira, 1897; Sofia, 1900).

See also
 Lyzohub Government, the longest serving governments of Ukraine in 1917-1920

References

External links
 Fedir Lyzohub at the History of Poltava portal.
 Fedir Lyzohub at the Cabinet of Ukraine website

1851 births
1928 deaths
People from Chernihiv Oblast
People from Chernigovsky Uyezd
Ukrainian people in the Russian Empire
Otamans of Council of Ministers
Interior ministers of Ukraine
Fedir
Ukrainian Cossacks
Duninowie
Octobrists
Recipients of the Order of Saint Stanislaus (Russian), 2nd class
Recipients of the Order of Saint Stanislaus (Russian), 1st class
Recipients of the Order of St. Anna, 2nd class
Recipients of the Order of St. Vladimir, 4th class
Recipients of the Order of St. Vladimir, 3rd class